The Welsh National League (Wrexham Area) was a football league in Wales and operated at level 3 and 4 of the Welsh football league system in Flintshire and Wrexham County Borough, but with some teams from Denbighshire (Corwen and Llangollen Town) and Gwynedd (Llanuwchllyn).  For sponsorship purposes it was last known as the Guy Walmsley & Co Welsh National League.

History
The League grew out of the Wrexham and District League which ran during the early years of the twentieth century. At that time the senior clubs in the Wrexham area played in English leagues such as The Combination and the Birmingham & District League. Their reserve sides, along with local amateur teams, contested the Wrexham and District League (1903–1912). The Wrexham and District League folded in 1912 and its clubs joined the North Wales Alliance League.

In the inter-war years, the new Welsh National League with its various sections was organised. Clubs from the Wrexham area, and the rest of North Wales, joined the Welsh National League Northern Section which ran from 1921–1930.

Teams from the Wrexham Area competed in the Wrexham and District League (1925–1939).

After World War II they re-organised as the Welsh National League (Wrexham Area).

At the end of the 2019–20 season the league folded as part of the reorganisation on the Welsh football pyramid, with the Football Association of Wales taking over running tier 3 leagues and local football associations tier 4.

Member clubs for the final 2019–20 season

Divisional Champions
The league underwent various restructures in its history, with the number of divisions and their names changing.

For its first season the league had just one division, the Senior Division.

In 1946 two regional divisions were introduced below the Senior Division.

In 1949 the regionalised divisions were merged and the resulting three divisions renamed Divisions One, Two and Three.

In 1953–54 Division Three was not contested due to a lack of clubs.

In 1954 Division Three was revived.

In 1960 Division Three was discontinued once again.

In 1962 Division Three was revived once again.

In 1969 Division Three was split into two sections, A and B.

In 1970 the two Division Three sections were reorganised into Divisions Three and Four.

In 1974 the four divisions were reduced to just two.

In 1975 Division Three was reintroduced.

In 1976 Division Three was discontinued once again.

In 1978 Divisions Three and Four were revived.

In 1978 Division Four was discontinued once again.

In 1980 Division Four was once again revived.

In 1983 Division Four was split into two sections, North and South.

In 1983 the two Division Four sections were merged back and the four divisions renamed Premier, One, Two and Three.

In 1990 Division Three was discontinued.

In 1999 Division Three was revived.

In 2008, all reserve and colts teams were split off, leaving two divisions for first teams and two divisions for lower teams.

References

External links
 League website

See also
Football in Wales
Welsh football league system
Welsh Cup
List of football clubs in Wales
List of stadiums in Wales by capacity

 
Sport in Wrexham County Borough
2020 disestablishments in Wales
Sports leagues disestablished in 2020
Defunct football competitions in Wales